Augustinus Hellemans (14 September 1907 – 30 April 1992) was a Belgian footballer. He played in two matches for the Belgium national football team in 1931.

References

External links
 

1907 births
1992 deaths
Belgian footballers
Belgium international footballers
Place of birth missing
Association footballers not categorized by position